Ruby Red is the third studio album from American musician The Love Language. It was released in July 2013 under Merge Records.

Track listing

References

2013 albums
Merge Records albums
The Love Language albums